The Sloss Islands are an uninhabited archipelago in Louisiade Archipelago.

The Sloss Islands belong to the Calvados Chain.

The archipelago consists of two islands, Rara (19 ha ) and Pana Roba (17 ha). The island is located on the northeast side of Tawal-reef.
Rara, previously inhabited, is now being used as fishermen huts for the men departing from Utian Island.
The men are also claiming coconuts on both islands.

References

Archipelagoes of Papua New Guinea
Islands of Milne Bay Province
Louisiade Archipelago